Steven H Silver (born April 19, 1967) is an American science fiction fan and bibliographer, publisher, author, and editor.  He has been nominated for the Hugo Award for Best Fan Writer twelve times and Best Fanzine seven times without winning (three for Argentus and four for Journey Planet).

The "H" is his middle name and not an initial.

Editor, publisher, and writer
Silver was born in Hinsdale, Illinois. He is a longtime contributing editor to SF Site and wrote that site's news page from its inception in 2002 until it closed in 2014.

Anthologies

In 2003, he co-edited three anthologies with Martin H. Greenberg, Wondrous Beginnings, Magical Beginnings, and Horrible Beginnings, which reprinted the first published stories of authors in the science fiction, fantasy, and horror genres. From 2004 through 2012 he was the publisher and editor of ISFiC Press. He co-edited the alternate history anthology Alternate Peace in 2019 with Joshua Palmatier.

Short fiction

Silver published his first short story, "Les Lettres de Paston", in the final issue of Helix SF. Silver had earlier written a column on alternate history for the magazine. He has continued to publish short stories since, as well as some poetry.

Collections

In 2009 and 2010, he edited the two volume Selected Stories of Lester del Rey for NESFA Press.  The first volume is entitled War and Space and appeared in August, 2009. The second volume, Robots and Magic was published in February 2010.

Novels

Silver's first novel, After Hastings, an alternate history in which Harold Godwinson prevented the Norman conquest of Britain by defeating William the Conqueror at the Battle of Hastings, was published by Ring of Fire Press in July 2020.

Fandom

Sidewise and Nebula Awards
In 1995, he founded the Sidewise Award for Alternate History and has served as a judge ever since. He was on the short story jury for the Nebula Award in 2002, and on the novel jury for the Nebula Award in 2003, 2006, and chaired the novel jury in 2008. In 2005, Silver was one of the co-ordinators of the Nebula weekend in Chicago. In 2008, he was appointed SFWA Event Coordinator and has helped run the Nebula Award Weekends in that capacity since 2009.

Fanzines
Silver is known as an on-line reviewer and has written several articles for science fiction fanzines, as well as publishing his own annual fanzine Argentus, which was nominated for a Hugo Award for Best Fanzine in 2008, 2009, and 2010, and won the Chronic Rift Roundtable Award for Best Fanzine in 2009 and the monthly APA-zine Plata. He has guest edited four issues of Journey Planet.

Conventions
In addition to his writing and editing activities, Silver is involved in running science fiction conventions. He has chaired Windycon three times, founded Midfan and chaired the first Midwest Construction, and ran programming for Chicon 2000, the Worldcon. From 1998 through 2006 and again from 2008, he sat on the board of directors for ISFiC. He served as a vice chair for Chicon 7 in 2012.

Personal background
In 2000, Silver appeared on Jeopardy! winning two days and coming in second on his third day. He won $15,000.

Bibliography

Novels
 After Hastings (June 2020),

Short fiction
 "Les Lettres de Paston" (2008), original publish in Helix SF magazine, but has been republished on SF Site
 "Bats in Thebayou" (2009), published in the anthology Zombie Raccoons & Killer Bunnies, 
 "Boleslaw Szymanski Gets the Ogden Slip" (2010)
 "In the Night" (2010), published in the anthology Love & Rockets, 
 "The Destiny of Einar the Brave" (2011)
 "In the Shadows of Broadway" (2012), featured on the StarShipSofa podcast #236
 "The Cremator's Tale" (2013), published in Black Gate magazine
 "Hunger on Ceos" (2015)
 "Village Square" (2015)
 "Well of Tranquility" (2016), published in the anthology Genius Loci: Tales of the Spirit of Place, 
 "Big White Men—Attack!" (2017), published in the anthology Little Green Men—Attack!, 
 "Doing Business at Hodputt's Emporium" (March 2018), published in Galaxy's Edge, Issue 31, 
 "A Letter Home" (2020), published in Ray Bradbury Experience Museum Newsletter, Volume 2
 "Worst in Show" (2022), published in the anthology Ludlow Charlington's Doghouse
 "Best Policy" (2022), published in the anthology Wyrms

References

External links
 
 
 

1967 births
Living people
Alternate history fandom
Indiana University alumni
Jeopardy! contestants
American alternate history writers
American fantasy writers
American science fiction writers
Science fiction editors
People from Hinsdale, Illinois
Male speculative fiction editors